Barenboim is a Yiddish surname. Notable people with the surname include:

Daniel Barenboim (born 1942), pianist and conductor
 (1910–1984 ), Soviet theorist and bridge building practitioner
Lev Barenboim (1906–1985), Russian pianist and musicologist
 (born 1985),  classical violinist

See also
7163 Barenboim, main-belt minor planet
Birnbaum, German form

Jewish surnames
Yiddish-language surnames